WASP-52 is a K-type main-sequence star about 570 light-years away. It is older than the Sun at  billion years, but it has a similar fraction of heavy elements.
The star has prominent starspot activity, with 3% to 14% of the stellar surface covered by areas 575 K cooler than the rest of the photosphere.

A multiplicity survey in 2015 did not detect any stellar companions. The star was named Anadolu in 2019 by Turkish astronomers as part of the NameExoWorlds contest.

Planetary system
In 2012 a transiting hot Jupiter planet, WASP-52b, was detected in a tight, circular orbit. The planet was named Göktürk by Turkish astronomers in December 2019. The planet has a small measured temperature difference between dayside (1481 K) and nightside (1224 K). Planetary orbit is well aligned with the equatorial plane of the star, the misalignment being 5.47°.

Search for transit timing variation did not result in detection of additional planets in system as in 2021.

A transmission spectrum taken in 2020 has revealed the presence of hydrogen, sodium and potassium, although the sodium and potassium lines may be attributable to volcanically active moons of the gas giant, not the planet itself. The atmosphere has no high winds and relatively low-lying clouds, indicating it is not significantly enriched by heavy elements. No signs of the planetary atmosphere escaping to space were detected  in 2020, but updated measurement in 2022 showed signs of helium escape, consistent with mass loss rate of 0.5% per billion years.

References

Pegasus (constellation)
K-type main-sequence stars
Planetary systems with one confirmed planet
Planetary transit variables
J23135873+0845405
Anadolu